The American Public Gardens Association, formerly the American Association of Botanical Gardens and Arboreta, is an association of public-garden institutions and professionals primarily in the United States and Canada. Over the last six decades, the American Public Gardens Association has emerged as the premiere association for public gardens in North America. Today, the Association's 500 member institutions are located in all 50 states, the District of Columbia, Canada and fourteen other countries. The Association's individual members live in every state, the District of Columbia, Canada, and 24 other countries.

Programs
APGA has partnered with the National Oceanic and Atmospheric Administration (NOAA) to create the Climate and Sustainability Alliance. The Alliance promotes the exchange of information related to global Climate Change. The Alliance has created the Public Gardens Sustainability Index to offer best practices for gardeners with consideration of the financial, environmental, and social impacts of sustainability decisions.

The Association also administers the Plant Collections Network. As part of this program, APGA has since 1995 partnered with the United States Department of Agriculture’s Agriculture Research Service and the National Arboretum to accredit exceptional public gardens.

See also

National Public Gardens Day

References

Environmental organizations based in Pennsylvania
Environmental organizations based in Canada